Edmund Kirby (1838–1920) was an English architect.  He was born in Liverpool, educated at Sedgeley Park School and Oscott College.  He was articled to E. W. Pugin, then worked for Hardman & Co., and for John Douglas in Chester.  By 1863 he was practising in Birkenhead and by 1866 his office was in Derby Buildings, 24 Fenwick Street, Liverpool.  He was a Roman Catholic and he designed many churches for that denomination.  Most of his work was in Liverpool, the northwest of England, and North Wales.  He designed 14 churches for the Diocese of Shrewsbury and built 15 Roman Catholic schools.  In addition he designed a great variety of other buildings.  Two of his sons joined him in his business, which is still in existence.  Many of his commissions were for Roman Catholic buildings.

Key

Works

References

Bibliography

Architecture in England
Gothic Revival architecture in England
1838 births
1920 deaths
Alumni of St Mary's College, Oscott
Architecture of Liverpool
Church architecture
Kirby, Edmund